is a JR West railway station located in Shimonoseki, Yamaguchi Prefecture, Japan.

History 
The station was opened to public on 19 July 1958, and has been used only for passenger services.

Facilities 
The station is unmanned, having a single side platform and a passenger shelter.

External links 

Railway stations in Yamaguchi Prefecture
Sanin Main Line
Stations of West Japan Railway Company
Railway stations in Japan opened in 1958